The Anglican Diocese of Ife is one of 17 within the Anglican Province of Ibadan, itself one of 14 provinces within the Church of Nigeria. The current bishop is Olubunmi Akinlade.

The Ife District Church Council were inaugurated in 1903 by the Rt. Revd. Charles Phillips, Assistant Bishop of Lagos stationed at Ondo. In 1919 all the Anglican Churches in  Ife Divisions were created into Ife District Church Council by Bishop Phillips.

Notes

Church of Nigeria dioceses
Dioceses of the Province of Ibadan